(March 18, 1927 – April 2, 2018) was a Japanese actor and voice actor from Okayama Prefecture. He was affiliated with Gekidan Subaru. He was married to fellow voice actress Reiko Niimura.

Live-action roles

Film
Nihon Chinbotsu (1973) (Research member)
Panic High School (1978) (Kobayashi)
The Fall of Ako Castle (1978) (Gengobee Toda)
Onimasa (1982) (Kankichi Umeda)

Television drama
Ōoku (1968) (Manabe Akifusa)
Oretachi wa Tenshi da! (1979) episode #9
Haru no Sakamichi (1971) (Naoe Kanetsugu)
Ōgon no Hibi (1978) (Ishida Masazumi)
Ōoku (episode #13, 1983) (Michizō Enjuin)
Sanga Moyu (1984) (Saburō Kurusu)

Unknown date
Key Hunter (episode #163) (Trade Director Kida)
Mito Kōmon (Strange person (season 20, episode 33), Tsushimaya (season 21, episode 14), Tomezō (season 25, episode 6))
Sanbiki ga Kiru! (first series, episode 6) (Touan Yamazaki)
Sanbiki ga Kiru! (fourth series, episode 8) (Kenmotsu Shimojima)
Abarenbō Shōgun (Series VI Special)

Voice roles

Theatrical animation
Royal Space Force: The Wings of Honnêamise (1987) (General Khaidenn)

OVA
Rurouni Kenshin: Trust & Betrayal (1999) (Tatsumi)

Video games
Kingdom Hearts II (2005) (Merlin)

Dubbing

Live-action
Henry Fonda
12 Angry Men (1974 NTV edition) (Juror #8)
The Longest Day (1978 NTV edition) (Brig. Gen. Theodore Roosevelt Jr.)
Madigan (1978 TV Asashi edition) (Commissioner Anthony X. Russell)
Midway (1981 NTV edition) (Admiral Chester W. Nimitz)
Rollercoaster (1981 NTV edition) (Simon Davenport)
Michael Gough
Batman (1995 TV Asashi edition) (Alfred Pennyworth)
Batman Returns (1994 TV Asashi edition) (Alfred Pennyworth)
Batman Forever (1998 TV Asashi edition) (Alfred Pennyworth)
Batman & Robin (2000 TV Asashi edition) (Alfred Pennyworth)
Richard Crenna
First Blood (1985 NTV and 1995 TV Asahi editions) (Col. Sam Trautman)
Rambo: First Blood Part II (1995 TV Asahi edition) (Col. Sam Trautman)
Rambo III (1994 TV Asahi edition) (Col. Sam Trautman)
Airport '77 (1981 NTV edition) (Philip Stevens (James Stewart))
Babe (Arthur Hoggett (James Cromwell))
Babe: Pig in the City (Arthur Hoggett (James Cromwell))
Beethoven (Dr. Herman Varnick (Dean Jones))
Born on the Fourth of July (VHS edition) (Eli Kovic (Raymond J. Barry))
Braveheart (King Edward "Longshanks" (Patrick McGoohan))
Cape Fear (1991) (Lee Heller (Gregory Peck))
Cleopatra (1975 NTV edition) (Julius Caesar (Rex Harrison))
Crazy like a Fox (Harrison "Harry" Fox, Senior (Jack Warden))
Ed Wood (Bela Lugosi (Martin Landau))
The Empire Strikes Back (1992 TV Asahi edition) (Yoda)
ER (Doctor Gabriel Lawrence (Alan Alda))
Finding Forrester (William Forrester (Sean Connery))
Geronimo: An American Legend (Al Sieber (Robert Duvall))
The Godfather Part II (1980 NTV edition) (Senator Pat Geary (G. D. Spradlin))
Indiana Jones and the Last Crusade (1994 NTV edition) (Dr. Marcus Brody (Denholm Elliott))
The Pelican Brief (The President (Robert Culp))
Shenandoah (1972 TBS edition) (Charlie Anderson (James Stewart))
Superman (1983 TV Asahi edition) (Jonathan Kent (Glenn Ford))
Tucker: The Man and His Dream (Homer Ferguson (Lloyd Bridges))

Animation
An American Tail: Fievel Goes West (Wylie Burp)
Disney productions (Pony Canyon and Bandai editions) (Pete)
Disney Sing-Along Songs (Professor Owl)
Dumbo (The Ringmaster)
Hercules (Amphitryon)
The Land Before Time (Littlefoot's grandfather)
Mickey's Magical World (Jiminy Cricket)
Mickey's Christmas Carol (Ghost of Christmas Present)
Peter Pan (Pony Canyon edition) (George Darling)
Pinocchio (Pony Canyon edition) (Gepetto)
Robin Hood (Bandai edition) (Prince John)
Sinbad: Legend of the Seven Seas (King Dymas)
The Sword in the Stone (Merlin)
Toot, Whistle, Plunk and Boom (Professor Owl)
We're Back! A Dinosaur's Story (Captain Neweyes)
Winnie-the-Pooh (Pony Canyon edition) (Tigger)

References

External links
Talent resume
 

1927 births
2018 deaths
Japanese male film actors
Japanese male television actors
Japanese male voice actors
Male voice actors from Okayama Prefecture